Asperula rumelica is a species of flowering plant in the family Rubiaceae. It was first described in 1856 and is endemic to Bulgaria, Greece, Romania, Russia, Turkey, and Ukraine.

References

rumelica
Flora of Bulgaria
Flora of Greece
Flora of Romania
Flora of South European Russia
Flora of Turkey
Flora of European Turkey
Flora of Ukraine
Taxa named by Pierre Edmond Boissier